Torricella Verzate is a comune (municipality) in the Province of Pavia in the Italian region Lombardy, located about 50 km south of Milan and about 20 km south of Pavia. As of December 31, 2004, it had a population of 829 and an area of 3.6 km².

Torricella Verzate borders the following municipalities: Corvino San Quirico, Mornico Losana, Oliva Gessi, Robecco Pavese, Santa Giuletta.

Demographic evolution

References

Cities and towns in Lombardy